Luigi Colani (born Lutz Colani 2 August 1928 – 16 September 2019) was a German industrial designer.

His long career began in the 1950s when he designed cars for companies including Fiat, Alfa Romeo, Lancia, Volkswagen, and BMW. In 1957, he dropped his first name Lutz using the name Luigi. In the 1960s, he began designing furniture, and as of the 1970s, he expanded in numerous areas, ranging from household items such as ballpoint pens and television sets to uniforms and trucks and entire kitchens. A striking grand piano created by Colani, the Pegasus, is manufactured and sold by the Schimmel piano company.

His unconventional designs made him famous, not only in design circles, but also to the general public. He received numerous design awards, although his unconventional approach left him largely an outsider from the mainstream of industrial design.

Style 
The prime characteristic of his designs are the rounded, organic forms, which he terms "biodynamic" and claims are ergonomically superior to traditional designs. His "kitchen satellite" from 1969 is the most prominent example of this school of thought. Many of his designs for small appliances are being mass-produced and marketed, but his larger designs have not been built, "a whole host of futuristic concepts that will have us living in pods and driving cars so flat that leg amputation is the only option."

Life and career 
Born in Berlin, Colani was the son of a Swiss film set designer of Kurdish descent<ref>Concept Car Design: Driving the Dream , p. 84</ref> and a mother of Polish descent.

 1950s 

By 1953, he was living in California where he was Head of New Materials project group at McDonnell Douglas in California.

Moving to auto design, in 1954, he received the Golden Rose international prize for creation and design, in Geneva, Switzerland, for special Fiat bodywork; he would be the originator of many Fiat designs in the coming years. A constant innovator, by 1958 he was also interested in sailing vessels. His catamaran design was a racing success in Hawaii.

Returning to cars, in 1963 he introduced the world's first plastic monocoque sports car, based on the BMW 700, and in 1960 the world's first kit car in series, the Colani GT, which sold 1,700 copies. In 1966 he showed his sports coupe design at the IAA in Frankfurt.

1960s
By the 1960s, his design range had also expanded to include household objects and furniture, beginning in 1963 with his elephant piggy bank, and in 1965 he gained worldwide success with furniture designs for Asko, Fritz-Hansen (Körperform chairs), Cor, and Kusch+Co. He also rebodied an Abarth Alfa Romeo design, based on two wrecked Abarth 1000 GT Coupés in the early 1960s.

In 1968, for Thai Airlines, he developed a two piece plastic cutlery set which the Museum of Design, Zürich, added to its collection.

1970s
He had developed a sufficient reputation and income by 1970 to establish a studio with a major design team at Harkotten Castle near Sassenberg, Germany. The studio was an enormous success, with work and exhibitions worldwide for many major companies. Meanwhile, he continued with his innovations in car design, including his 1972 design of the Eifelland Formula One car.

This period saw him making his first forays into the Japanese market, when he obtained contracts from Japanese companies for the first time. In 1973, he made his first study trip to the Far East, during which Japanese buyers recognized Colani's potential. He received invitations by five companies to establish a Colani Design Center Japan.

About this time, the "Drop" teapot he designed for Rosenthal, a world leader in porcelain, was acquired for inclusion in the Cooper-Hewitt Museum in New York. In 1999, Rosenthal promoted a special edition of his now-famous design.

Not all of his designs were successes. For example, he created an unsuccessful design for an Olympic row boat. About this time, in the early 1970s he developed his first streamlined truck design, which he said, "was a direct response to the world oil crisis yet nobody noticed my design. They didn’t get the message." He would revisit streamlined trucks later in the decade to more fanfare.

Colani's first profession as an aeronautics designer was revisited in 1976 when he was assigned the task of designing the  RFB Fanliner, the first plastic sports airplane with a Wankel rotary engine. Later, in 1985, he unveiled the Pontresina propeller-driven airplane, having two contra-rotating coaxial pusher propellers with scimitar blades mounted in the tail. The propellers, also known as "centripetal supersonic propellers", were a new design idea. The plane was a design study and is not airworthy.

By 1978, his revolutionary trucks, aircraft, car and ship studies had begun to be seen frequently at exhibitions worldwide. His interest in fuel economy continued into the 1980s. In 1981, he set a fuel economy world record set with the four-seater Colani 2CV (based on the French Citroën 2CV which consumed just 1.7 litres of gasoline to travel 100 km using a stock 2CV engine and chassis.

1980s

The year 1982 saw Colani relocating to Japan, where a year later he accepted a position as professor in Tokyo.

For Canon, he developed the "5 Systems" camera prototypes and in 1984, he was voted the No. 1 industrial designer in Japan at the Otaru exhibition for his 60 m large shell. In 1986, he received the Golden Camera Award for the Canon T90.

In 1985, his Robot Theater was the most-attended pavilion at Expo '85.

In 1986, one of his motorcycles set a world record in Italy. That year, he founded Colani Design Bern in Switzerland.

He continued to show his designs at international exhibitions, including a 1987 show at Centre Georges Pompidou, Paris. Car designs continued in Japan for Mazda and he did a pen design for Pelikan A.G., Germany. The Colani Cormoran aircraft design was shown in mockup at the Paris Air Show

In 1988 he opened offices in Toulouse and Bremen. He was also appointed a professor at the University of the Arts Bremen, as he meanwhile prepared on a wide-scale basis to establish new speed records on land, water and air and economy world records in Utah. He set records in a specially-designed Ferrari at Bonneville Speedway in 1991.

In 1989 he formed Colani Trading AG in Zurich, Switzerland.

In 1989, Colani organized AUTOMORROW '89 where 12 futuristic vehicles toured the U.S. from coast to coast in two trucks. Lectures and demos included at Ford in Detroit, test drivwes on the Bonneville salt flats and the Art Center of Design in Passadena.

1990s

The 1990s brought more exhibitions and more designs. He mounted an exhibition at the Centre International de l'Automobile car museum in Paris and in 1993 held shopping center expositions through Switzerland.

He designed new uniforms for aircrew at Swissair, the last designs used by the airline before re-branding as Swiss in 2002. In 1991, he designed an optical frame and jewelry collection. Also in the decade, other designs included field glasses (1993); office furniture designs for Grahl, Michigan USA (1996); a new piano for famous piano builder Wilhelm Schimmel (1997); a water bottle design for Carolinen-Brunnen, Germany and a new microscope and photo camera (both 1998); and new shower (bathroom-combination)-generation for the German company Dusar and a furniture project with Kusch & Co., Germany (1999).

In 1997 he designed the grand piano "Pegasus" in cooperation with the German piano manufacturer Schimmel Pianos, revolutionizing the traditional form and design of pianos. Schimmel builds no more than two of these instruments each year, and only to order. Celebrity owners of a Pegasus grand piano have included Prince, Lenny Kravitz, and Eddy Murphy.

The 1990s and 2000s (decade) also brought his share of design commissions in the field of desktop computing. Projects included a computer mouse design for Sicos (1992); the Colani Vobis Highscreen computer, awarded Computer of the Year in 1994; a bank terminal design project with one of the world's leading computer manufacturers (1998).
By 1995, he had begun to branch into whole structures. that year, he completed designs for major companies in the construction and building industry. China's ambassador invited Colani for future projects to Shanghai, China. There, he was awarded an honorary professorship in the Department of Architecture, College of Architecture and Urban Planning at Tongji University The following year, he unveiled his architecture project for Shanghai, called Bio-City.

2000s
His architectural designs continued with the "Human-City" architecture model for MW Energie AG in Mannheim, Germany (2000) and subsequently with an experimental house design for Hanse-Haus, the German prefabricators.

He designed new optical frames presented at shows in Milan, Paris and Las Vegas and in 2001 designed a new microscope and photo camera (for Seagull) at the Colani Shanghai office. He held more than thirty exhibitions in shopping malls (ECE-group) throughout Germany. He also opened of a world-leading museum of design, Pinakothek der Moderne, in Munich, Germany which featured several Colani designs (2002).

In the realm of packaging design, he created a new bottle design for the leading Swiss mineral-water company Valser (acquired by Coca-Cola in 2002) and created porcelain giftware creations (Cappuccino, Espresso mugs).

He undertook a "Life on Board" project for Volvo cars and created a futuristic car design called the Speedster shark.
He continued his large Supertruck designs with extreme streamlining, this time for Spitzer-Silo; the result was presented at the IAA in Hanover, Germany (2004).

A notable uniform commission was the 2003 re-design of police uniforms for the Hamburg Police department, which was later adopted throughout the whole of Germany.

In the years 2004 to 2007, a retrospective exhibition of Colani's work, called COLANI – Das Lebenswerk, took place in the "Nancy hall" of the congress center of Karlsruhe. The exhibition was not continued as funding of the hall's renovation was not achieved.

In 2007, the Design Museum in London showed his work in the exhibit Translating Nature''.

In avionics, he designed the tt-62-plane for hp-aircraft.de. He also completed a design study for a 1,000 seat passenger airplane (2005).

He completed a series of 140 sculptures of athletes for the Olympic Games in Beijing. He also participated in the "Germany in Japan 2005-6" event in the form of the "Colani Back in Japan" exhibition in the Museum for Art and Design attached to the Kyoto Institute of Technology. He also carried out a study for a robot shaped like a baby.

In 2013 the first Model (AC22) of the AGOS Luxury Computer Series, Opus Magnum, was presented at the Nowa Zukunftsmesse in Marburg, Germany.

Personal life 
Colani was married to Ya Zhen Zhao since the 1990s and resided in Shanghai, China. His son Solon Luigi Colani lives in Berlin where he also works as a designer and does special effects work in the movie industry.
He was a guest speaker and presenter at the 2004 World Economic Forum in Davos, Switzerland.

Colani died in Karlsruhe in 2019.

His brother Victor Colani (born 1933 in Berlin) was a designer, too.

References

External links 
 
 
 Colani Design Germany GmbH
 Colani Trading AG
 Colani Museum
 On-line Design Museum showing many Colani Products
 Japanese Colani fan web site
 3 pictures of the Kitchen Satellite
 TT62 Alekto
 1968 Two piece plastic cutlery in Museum of Design Zurich collection
 Concept Trucks of Future
 Website of his son's design company and his Instagram  and IMDb pages
 Interview with Luigi Colani in Interview Magazine
 Article in the New York Times: Colani’s Concepts Make Concept Cars Look Tame (2007)

1928 births
2019 deaths
19th-century German architects
German automobile designers
German people of Swiss descent
Aircraft designers
Artists from Berlin
People from Treptow-Köpenick
Formula One designers